Jorge Luis Reyes Graterol (born August 28, 1971 in Caracas) is a Venezuelan actor and model best known for his work in Venezuelan telenovelas.

Reyes began his artistic career as a model before going into acting where he played secondary roles. He obtained his first main role in 1997 in the telenovela Destino de Mujer alongside Sonya Smith. Since, he has obtained leading roles in telenovelas filmed in the United States such as La Revancha in 2000 and Valeria in 2009, Todos quieren con Marilyn filmed in Colombia in 2004 and in his native Venezuela.

In 2007, he made his film debut in the film Miranda Regresa where he portrayed the Venezuelan revolutionary Francisco de Miranda.

Filmography

Movies

Telenovelas

References

External links

20th-century Venezuelan male actors
Venezuelan male telenovela actors
1971 births
21st-century Venezuelan male actors
Male actors from Caracas
Living people